Under the Representation of the People Act 1948 and the House of Commons (Redistribution of Seats) Act 1949 new constituency boundaries were defined and first used in the 1950 general election of the House of Commons of the Parliament of the United Kingdom (Westminster).

In Scotland, where boundaries had been unaltered since 1918, the legislation defined 32 burgh constituencies (BCs) and 39 county constituencies (CCs), with each electing one Member of Parliament (MP) by the first past the post system of election. Therefore, Scotland had 71 parliamentary seats.

Each constituency was entirely within a county or a grouping of two counties, or was if the cities of Aberdeen, Dundee, Edinburgh and Glasgow are regarded as belonging, respectively to the county of Aberdeen, the county of Angus, the county of Midlothian and the county of Lanark.

There were changes to the boundaries of six Scottish constituencies for the 1951 general election but, throughout the 1950 to 1955 period, there was no change to county groupings, to the total numbers of constituencies and MPs, or to constituency names.

Boundaries used during the 1950 to 1955 period represented an interim arrangement pending the outcome of the First Periodical Review of the boundary commissions. The results of the review were implemented for the 1955 general election.

Notes and references 

 1950
1950 establishments in Scotland
1955 disestablishments in Scotland
Constituencies of the Parliament of the United Kingdom established in 1950
Constituencies of the Parliament of the United Kingdom disestablished in 1955